Noé Muñoz (born 11 November 1967 in Ecatepec, State of México) is a Mexican baseball catcher who played for the Los Angeles Dodgers in Major League Baseball (MLB) in 1995.

He is a former Major League Baseball player. He played in two games for the Los Angeles Dodgers during the 1995 season. Muñoz has had an extensive career in the Mexican League, last playing for the Saraperos de Saltillo over the 1999–2014 seasons. He played for the Mexico national team in the 2008 Americas Baseball Cup.

In 2018, Muñoz was as the first base coach for the Bravos de León of the Mexican Baseball League.

References

External links

Recent Mexican League stats

1967 births
Living people
Albuquerque Dukes players
Algodoneros de Guasave players
Bakersfield Dodgers players
Baseball players at the 2007 Pan American Games
Broncos de Reynosa players
Diablos Rojos del México players
Industriales de Monterrey players
Los Angeles Dodgers players
Pan American Games bronze medalists for Mexico
Pan American Games medalists in baseball
Major League Baseball catchers
Major League Baseball players from Mexico
Mexican expatriate baseball players in the United States
Mexican League baseball catchers
Minor league baseball managers
San Antonio Missions players
Saraperos de Saltillo players
People from Ecatepec de Morelos
Baseball players from the State of Mexico
Medalists at the 2003 Pan American Games